The football competition at the 2010 Summer Youth Olympics took place between 12–25 August. The draw was made on 18 May 2010. Players must be 15 years old (born between 1 January and 31 December 1995) to be eligible to participate. Playing time was made up of two periods of 40 minutes with a half-time break of 15 minutes.

Teams

Medal summary

Participating teams

Boys

Girls

External links
Football Competition Schedule
Boys' Youth Olympic Football Tournament Singapore 2010 , FIFA.com
Girls' Youth Olympic Football Tournament Singapore 2010 , FIFA.com

 
Summer Youth Olympics
Football
2010
2010
Kallang